Longford is a village and civil parish in Gloucestershire, England. Although situated within two miles of Gloucester city centre, Longford parish falls within the jurisdiction of the Borough of Tewkesbury.

The village borders the Tewkesbury Road running north out of Gloucester and is bisected by the  A40 northern bypass at the busy Longford roundabout. Connected with Segregated Bicycle Path to Gloucester.

Longford is primarily residential, and is home to Oxstalls Sports Park and Tennis Centre, the Winfield Hospital and both Longford AFC and Gala Wilton Football Clubs.

History
From Gloucester, the Tewkesbury road ran northwards from Alvin gate through the settlements of Kingsholm, Longford, and Twigworth. In Kingsholm it was joined by a road from the blind gate, which in its south part was known in 1803 as Dean's Walk and in its north part in 1722 as Snake Lane (later Edwy Parade). Bridges and a causeway carried the Tewkesbury road over water courses and low-lying meadows in Longford, which took its name from the crossing.

On the Tewkesbury road north of Kingsholm a house was converted into three cottages in the early 19th century. Further north in Longford there was a small early settlement at the south end of the causeway, where a medieval cross and possibly a chapel stood. There was evidently a house there by the early 13th century, when a man surnamed of the plock was recorded, and Plock Court, east of the road, occupied the site of a medieval manor house.

Extract from Lewis's Topographical Dictionary of England, 1831:
LONGFORD, a hamlet in those parts of the parishes of ST-CATHERINE, and ST-MARY-de-LODE-GLOUCESTER, which are in the upper division of the hundred of DUDSTONE-and-KING'S-BARTON, county of GLOUCESTER, 1 mile (N.E. by N.) from Gloucester, containing 215 inhabitants.
In 1851 market gardeners were fairly numerous in Longford and Twigworth, and later there were several market gardens and nurseries at Longlevens (called Springfield) and Innsworth. In 1855 the civil parish of Longford was created.

In 1870-72, John Marius Wilson's Imperial Gazetteer of England and Wales described Longford like this:
LONGFORD-ST.CATHERINE, a hamlet in St. Catherine parish, Gloucestershire; contiguous to Gloucester city, 1 mile N of Gloucester r. station. Acres, 200. Real property, with Longford-St. Mary, £4,735. Pop.. 213. Houses, 37. The manor belongs to the Bishop of Gloucester; and most of the land, to the Dean and Chapter. A Roman settlement is supposed to have been here.
In 1866 a free hospital for children of the poor was begun next to St. Lucy's Home of Charity on the site of the current Gambier Parry Gardens. The home, a converted villa east of the Tewkesbury Road, was occupied by the sisters of St. Lucy, an Anglican community founded in 1864 by Thomas Gambier Parry of Highnam to train nurses and tend the sick in their homes. By 1866 the sisters, who were sent to many parts of the country, nursed some patients in the home. Gambier Parry also conceived the idea for the children's hospital in connection with the home and paid much of the building costs. The hospital, a brick building designed by William Jacques, opened in 1867 with 22 beds. Children of the poor from any distance were admitted and out-patients were treated at a house in Bell Lane. The hospital was supported by subscriptions and donations. In 1872 the sisters of St. John the Baptist from Clewer, Berkshire, took over the work of the sisters of St. Lucy. In 1876, Gambier Parry moved the home to a large house at the corner of Hare Lane and Pitt Street.

Education
Longford Park Primary Academy, a new primary school and nursery with 210 places, opened at Whittington Park, Longford, in September 2017 near the Longford Village Hall.

From 2017 to 2022, the University of Gloucestershire made significant improvements to Plock Court as part of its Oxstalls Campus redevelopment. The improvements comprised a new business school and growth hub together with substantial sports facilities: a sports hall, 4G pitches, landscaping, and better community access.

Sport and entertainment
Every summer from 2013 to 2017, Oxstalls Sport Park, Plock Court was the venue for the Sportbeat Music Festival, a two day outdoor music and sports festival.

Sports activities include:
 Oxstalls Tennis Centre, Oxstalls Sports Park, with 6 indoor and 4 outdoor tennis courts
 Gala Wilton Football Club
 Longford A.F.C.

From 1981-83, Fairmile House in Fairmile Gardens was used as one of the filming locations for two series of the BBC2 TV sitcom The Last Song (TV series) starring Geoffrey Palmer (actor).

Flooding
Longford was severely affected by the July 2007 floods

resulting in the many homes being flooded. The bar at the Queen's Head on the Tewkesbury Road was under a couple of feet of water.

Other Longfords
Longford, Coventry
Longford, Derbyshire
Longford, Greater Manchester
Longford, Ireland
Longford, Kansas
Longford, Hillingdon
Longford, Market Drayton
Longford, Newport
Longford, Ontario
Longford, Tasmania
Longford, U.S. Virgin Islands
Longford, Victoria 
Longford, Warrington 
Longford Mills, Ramara, Ontario (Neighborhood)
Longford River

References

External links 
 Parish Council

Villages in Gloucestershire
Civil parishes in Gloucestershire
Borough of Tewkesbury